Non-voluntary euthanasia is euthanasia conducted when the explicit consent of the individual concerned is unavailable, such as when the person is in a persistent vegetative state, or in the case of young children. It contrasts with involuntary euthanasia, when euthanasia is performed against the will of the patient.

The different possible situations considered non-voluntary euthanasia are when the decision to end the life of the patient is 1) based on what the incapacitated individual would have wanted if they could be asked, 2) based on what the decision maker would want if he or she were in the patient's place, and 3) made by a doctor based on their own criteria and reasoning.

Legal status

Non-voluntary euthanasia can be divided into passive or active variants. Passive euthanasia entails the withholding of common treatments, such as antibiotics, necessary for the continuance of life. Active euthanasia entails the use of lethal substances or forces, such as administering a lethal injection, to kill and is the most controversial means. A number of authors consider these terms to be misleading and unhelpful.

Active non-voluntary euthanasia is illegal in all countries in the world, although it is practised in the Netherlands on infants (see below) under an agreement between physicians and district attorneys. Passive non-voluntary euthanasia (withholding life support) is legal in various countries, such as India, Albania, and many parts of the United States and is practiced in English hospitals.

Non-voluntary euthanasia has been heavily debated. For example, Len Doyal, a professor of medical ethics and former member of the ethics committee of the British Medical Association, argued for legalization, saying in 2006 that "[p]roponents of voluntary euthanasia should support non-voluntary euthanasia under appropriate circumstances and with proper regulation". Arguing against legalization, Peter Saunders, campaign director for Care Not Killing, an alliance of Christian and disability groups, called Doyal's proposals "the very worst form of medical paternalism whereby doctors can end the lives of patients after making a judgment that their lives are of no value and claim that they are simply acting in their patients' best interests".

Slippery slope debate

Non-voluntary euthanasia is cited as one of the possible outcomes of the slippery slope argument against euthanasia, in which it is claimed that permitting voluntary euthanasia to occur will lead to the support and legalization of non-voluntary and involuntary euthanasia, although other ethicists have contested this idea.

Non-voluntary euthanasia in the Netherlands

Permitted euthanasia in the Netherlands has been regulated by law since 2002. It states that euthanasia and physician-assisted suicide are not punishable if the attending physician acts in accordance with criteria of due care. Prior to the establishment of that law, euthanasia and assisted suicide in the Netherlands were already tolerated for many years, as for example described by G. van der Wal and R. J. Dillmann in 1994. In a 1994 study, of the studied 5000 requests in the Netherlands, in about 1000 of the cases, doctors prescribed drugs with the explicit goal of shortening the patient's life without the explicit request of the patient, which can be considered cases of non-voluntary euthanasia.

Since 2004, the Netherlands, also has a protocol to be followed in cases of euthanasia on children under the age of 12 (see also below), which was ratified by the Dutch National Association of Pediatricians, although the practice remains technically illegal. Together with colleagues and prosecutors, Eduard Verhagen developed the Groningen Protocol, in which cases prosecutors will refrain from pressing charges.

Non-voluntary euthanasia on children

Newborns and euthanasia
Active euthanasia on newborns is illegal throughout the world, with the de facto exception of the Netherlands mentioned above. Because a newborn child is never able to speak for themselves, euthanasia on newborns is by definition non-voluntary. An early example of documented cases of child euthanasia are those performed by the surgeon Harry J. Haiselden in Chicago in the early 20th century.

Ancient Greece

In ancient Greece, non-voluntary euthanasia of children was practiced as an early form of eugenics, the belief and practice of improving the genetic quality of the human population, usually by withdrawing care (i.e. passive euthanasia) rather than a physical extermination, an act termed as “exposure”.

See also
 Child euthanasia in Nazi Germany
 Coup de grâce
 Eugenics

References

Euthanasia